The 1982 Limerick Senior Hurling Championship was the 88th staging of the Limerick Senior Hurling Championship since its establishment by the Limerick County Board.

South Liberties were the defending champions.

On 12 September 1982, Patrickswell won the championship after a 0–17 to 0–15 defeat of Bruree in the final. It was their seventh championship title overall and their first title in three championship seasons.

Results

Final

References

Limerick Senior Hurling Championship
Limerick Senior Hurling Championship